The Archenemy Record Company is a record label founded in 1997 and located in Boston, Massachusetts. It is home to such acts as Freezepop, Lifestyle, The Texas Governor, Rockets Burst from the Streetlamps, Chop Chop, and Karacter.  The label is perhaps best known for Freezepop, which has gained a nationwide following after having music appearing in several video games, including Guitar Hero and FreQuency.

External links
 Archenemy Record Company web site
 Wired Magazine article on Freezepop and promotion

American record labels
Record labels established in 1997
Indie rock record labels
Synth-pop record labels